James F. Conway (born June 27, 1932 in St. Louis, Missouri) was an American businessman and politician in St. Louis, where he was elected as the 41st mayor of the city, serving from 1977 to 1981.

Early life and education
Conway was born in 1932 in St. Louis, Missouri, where he attended parochial schools. He attended Saint Louis University and received a B.S. in geophysical engineering, and an MBA in Business Administration.

Careers
Conway worked as a sales engineer and production manager for the Nooter Corporation. Later he served as president of A.C.I Plastics Company.

He had joined the Democratic Party and in 1966 he was elected as a state representative. He was re-elected and served more than one term. In 1974, he ran for and was elected to the Missouri State Senate.

Conway was determined to bring his expertise back to the city. In the March 1977 Democratic primary for mayor, Conway defeated former mayor A.J. Cervantes. He won the April general election by a large margin.

Like many mayors of St. Louis, Conway found it difficult to accomplish some of his goals within the city's system of divided government.  He and comptroller Raymond Percich differed on interpretations of the City Charter, and their battles became quite heated, with numerous lawsuits and threats of lawsuits.

Mayor Conway succeeded in getting voters to lift the $25,000 salary limit that had been contained in the city charter. Some saw the salary cap as a hindrance in recruiting and retaining highly qualified civil servants.  The duplication of services at the two public hospitals in St. Louis (City Hospital and Homer G. Phillips Hospital) concerned Mayor Conway.  His decision in 1979 to consolidate most hospital services at City Hospital was extremely unpopular with residents in North St. Louis, where Homer G. Phillips Hospital was located.

In 1981, Conway was defeated in his bid for re-election in the Democratic primary by Vincent C. Schoemehl.  After leaving office, Conway returned to his business, ACI Plastics, and remained active in civic affairs.  In the late 1990s and early 2000s, he and former mayors Vincent C. Schoemehl, Jr. and Freeman Bosley Jr. worked with a group called Citizens for Home Rule, which worked on various proposals to amend the city's charter.

Conway is married to the former Joan C. Newman and they have five grown children.  Their son Steven also became a  politician; he was elected to the St. Louis Board of Aldermen in 1991. After repeatedly winning re-election for several terms, in 2017 he was appointed by Mayor Lyda Krewson as City Assessor.

References 
Much of the original content for this article was based on the brief biographies of St. Louis Mayors found at the St. Louis Public Library's website, https://web.archive.org/web/20041013215847/http://exhibits.slpl.lib.mo.us/mayors/mayors4.asp

 
 
 

1932 births
Living people
Mayors of St. Louis
Democratic Party members of the Missouri House of Representatives
Democratic Party Missouri state senators
Saint Louis University alumni